The South Shore Railroad was a railroad in Massachusetts. It was incorporated in 1846 to provide rail service between Quincy and Duxbury, Massachusetts through the towns of Hingham, Cohasset, Scituate and Marshfield.

History
The 11.5 mile line opened for service from Braintree to Cohasset, on January 1, 1849. However, the 17.5 mile portion between Cohasset and Duxbury, Massachusetts, was not built until 1871 when a new company, the Duxbury and Cohasset Railroad completed the line to South Duxbury and Kingston where it connected to the old 1844 Old Colony Railroad line to Plymouth.

One of the early promoters and presidents of the South Shore Railroad was Caleb Stetson, a successful shoe manufacturer from Braintree.

The 1849 section of the South Shore Railroad was acquired by the Old Colony Railroad in 1877, while the section between Cohasset and Duxbury became part of the Old Colony network in 1904.

By this time, the entire Old Colony Railroad network was operated under lease agreement by the New York, New Haven and Hartford Railroad. The New Haven ceased passenger service on the South Shore Line and much of the rest of the Old Colony system in 1959.

On October 31, 2007, commuter rail passenger service on the line was restored from Boston to Greenbush with the opening of the MBTA Greenbush Line.

Nantasket Beach Railroad

The Nantasket Beach Railroad opened in 1880 as a branch off the South Shore but closed in 1886. It was reopened in 1886 and electrified, running until 1932. Winter service was replaced by buses beginning in 1926. Portions of the former railroad bed were converted to paved roads, including Fitzpatrick Way, in 1937.

See also
Old Colony Lines (MBTA)
Fore River Railroad

References

Defunct Massachusetts railroads
Old Colony Railroad lines